Yeovil Town Football Club is a professional association football club based in the town of Yeovil in Somerset, England. The club's home ground is Huish Park, built in 1990 on the site of an old army camp. That stadium is named after their former home, Huish, known for its pitch, which had an  sideline to sideline slope. The club's nickname "the Glovers" is a reference to the history of glove-making in the town of Yeovil, which became a centre of the industry during the 18th and 19th centuries.

Founded in 1895, the club initially joined the Somerset Senior League and competed in a multitude of leagues up until the outbreak of World War II. During this time they won titles in the Southern League, Western League, Bristol Charity League, Dorset District League and Somerset Senior League. They played in the Southern League after the war ended, winning the championship in 1954–55, 1963–64 and 1970–71, before becoming members of the Alliance Premier League from 1979 to 1985. They spent the next three years in the Isthmian League, and were promoted into the Conference after finishing as champions in 1987–88. Relegated in 1995, they were promoted again two years later after winning another Isthmian League title. Yeovil won the 2002 FA Trophy Final and secured a place in the Football League after winning the Conference in 2002–03 under the stewardship of Gary Johnson. They then won the League Two title in 2004–05, before reaching the Championship with victory in the 2013 Football League One play-off final in Johnson's second spell as manager. However they suffered consecutive relegations, and were relegated once more following the 2018–19 season, ending their 16-season spell in the Football League.

Yeovil are one of the most successful non-league teams in the FA Cup, having defeated major Football League teams, most famously Sunderland in the fourth round in 1949, before going on to play in front of more than 81,000 spectators away at Manchester United in the next round. For some years, as the only Football League side in Somerset, they have had few local rivalries since Weymouth and Bath City declined simultaneously as Yeovil climbed the divisions in the 1990s and 2000s.

History

Non-League football
Yeovil Football Club was founded in 1890, and shared its ground with the local rugby club for many years. Five years later, the current club was founded and named Yeovil Casuals and started playing home games at the Pen Mill Athletic Ground. In 1907 the name Yeovil Town was adopted, which on amalgamation with Petters United became Yeovil and Petters United.  The name reverted to Yeovil Town before the 1946–47 season.

The club came to national attention as 'giant-killers' during the 1948–49 FA Cup, in which they defeated Sunderland 2–1 in the fourth round, in front of a record home attendance of 17,000. They were defeated 8–0 in the following round by Manchester United.

 
Between 1955 and 1973 they were champions of the Southern Football League three times, and runners-up twice. During this period, Yeovil Town applied for election to the Football League on a number of occasions, coming within a few votes of being elected in 1976. In 1979 the Glovers were founder members of the new national non-league division, the Football Conference. In 1985, they were relegated to the Isthmian League. Yeovil won that championship in 1988 and returned to the Conference.

There was success in the Bob Lord Challenge Trophy in 1990 and three years later Yeovil finished fourth in the Conference, their best finish ever. In January 1995, former Weymouth and Spurs player Graham Roberts was appointed manager, but demotion back to the Isthmian League soon followed. Yeovil secured promotion back into the Conference in 1997 after winning the Isthmian League with a record number of points – 101.

Colin Lippiatt became manager for the 1998–99 season and brought Terry Skiverton to the club as a player. Gary Johnson took over as manager in June 2001 and Yeovil won the FA Trophy in his first season in charge with a 2–0 victory over Stevenage Borough in the final at Villa Park – the club's first major trophy. Yeovil Town earned promotion to the Football League in the following season, by winning the Football Conference by a record 17 points margin, accumulating 95 points and scoring 100 goals, remaining unbeaten at Huish Park. Their team included many top players, some of whom went on to play Premier League football. Notable players include Gavin Williams who moved to West Ham United, Lee Johnson, Chris Weale, Darren Way and Adam Lockwood.

Reaching the Football League
Yeovil's first game in the Football League was a 3–1 away win over Rochdale. The Glovers finished their first season in eighth position, and reached the third round of the FA Cup before losing 2–0 at home to Liverpool. Before the game the club released a record sold only in shops in the town: "Yeovil True" reached No. 36 in the UK Singles Chart. The following season Yeovil finished as champions of League Two with 83 points, earning promotion to League One. Partway through the season the club was sold by Jon Goddard-Watts to David Webb, who took over the role of chief executive from chairman John Fry.

At the beginning of the 2005–06 season manager Gary Johnson left Yeovil for Bristol City. He was replaced by his assistant Steve Thompson and Kevin Hodges was appointed as his number two. At the season's end Thompson was demoted to first-team coach and he was replaced by Russell Slade. Around this time John Fry had bought all Dave Webb's share of the club, becoming Yeovil Town's new owner. They again reached the fourth round of the FA Cup and were drawn away against Charlton Athletic, then in the Premier League, to whom they lost 3–2.

Yeovil finished the 2006–07 season in fifth position, qualifying for the League One play-offs. In the semi-final Yeovil beat Nottingham Forest in the two-legged match 5–4 on aggregate, after losing the first home leg 2–0. Yeovil met Blackpool at Wembley Stadium in the final, but were beaten 2–0.

The 2007–08 was less successful, as Yeovil finished 18th in League One with 52 points. Russell Slade continued as Yeovil manager into the 2008–09 season, but he left the position in February 2009. After one game with assistant manager Steve Thompson acting as caretaker manager, club captain Terry Skiverton was announced as manager until the end of the 2009–10 season, with Nathan Jones as his assistant. The duo kept Yeovil in League One, with safety secured following a 1–1 draw at Tranmere Rovers.

Skiverton and Jones helped Yeovil avoid relegation in the following two seasons, but a poor start the 2011–12 campaign prompted a change of manager. On 9 January 2012, the club announced the re-appointment of Gary Johnson, with Terry Skiverton becoming assistant. The Glovers went on to again achieve safety, finishing eleven points clear of the relegation zone.

Yeovil made their best ever start in the 2012–13 season, picking up 10 points from their first four games. Yeovil finished the 2012–13 season in 4th place, reaching the League One play-offs. They reached the final on 6 May 2013 after a 2–0 home victory against Sheffield United, overturning a 1–0 loss at Bramall Lane in the first leg. On 19 May 2013, Yeovil defeated Brentford 2–1 in the League One play-off final at Wembley, reaching the second tier for the first time in their history. Striker Paddy Madden, who netted the opening goal against Brentford at Wembley, finished as the league's top scorer.

Yeovil spent one season in the Championship and, despite enjoying memorable victories over Nottingham Forest, Sheffield Wednesday and Watford, suffered immediate relegation back to League One. The club's struggles continued the following season, although the club did earn a lucrative FA Cup tie against Manchester United, which they lost 2–0 despite a "gallant challenge". Manager Gary Johnson was eventually replaced by Paul Sturrock as Yeovil suffered another relegation, returning to League Two for the first time in 10 years.

Following a poor start to the 2015/16 season, Sturrock was sacked and replaced by Darren Way, initially in a caretaker role before being named permanent manager. Way was able to lead Yeovil to safety as they finished they campaign 19th in the table.

During Way's tenure as manager, Yeovil equalled their record for heaviest Football League defeat with an 8–2 loss to Luton Town on the opening day of the 2017–18 season, although they also recorded their highest Football League victory under his leadership with a 6–0 win over Newport County in September 2018. The club also enjoyed another FA Cup tie with Manchester United in January 2018, however they lost 4–0 to Jose Mourinho's side.

Return to Non-League football 
Yeovil's 16-year stay in the EFL came to an end when they were relegated during the 2018–19 season, following a 2–2 draw with Northampton Town.

Darren Sarll was unveiled as the club's new manager in June 2019 and a takeover of the club by a consortium led by Scott Priestnell and Errol Pope was announced in September 2019. On 22 April, the 2019–20 National League season was ended with immediate effect due to the coronavirus outbreak, with the Glovers fourth in the table.

In May 2022, South Somerset District Council completed the purchase of Huish Park and its surrounding land for £2.8 million from Yeovil Town Football Club's owner Scott Priestnall, with the football club becoming tenants of the Council through a leaseback arrangement.

In February 2023, it was announced that SU Glovers Limited, a company publicly fronted by Matt Uggla and former England rugby union international Paul Sackey, was in the process of completing a takeover of the majority shareholding of Yeovil Town Football and Athletic Club Limited. It was confirmed in a press conference held by the club that former majority shareholder and chairman, Scott Priestnall, would no longer be involved with the football club.

Recent seasons

Rivals

The Glovers have their strongest traditional rivalries with Weymouth, which has been described as intense, and fellow Somerset club, Bath City, with Yeovil and Bath having played one another precisely 272 times. The first game for which the grandstand at Twerton Park officially opened was an FA Cup-tie on November 12, 1932. Yeovil, at the time, were said to be much “much reviled” in Bath over the years. 5,345 watched the club beat Bath 4-2. The paper reported that the crowd were ‘strangely silent’,  with Bath fans stating “Losing to Yeovil always hurt”. However, both rivalries have dwindled significantly  over the past decades due to the lack of competitive meetings with Weymouth and Bath. The 2020–21 National League season marked the first league encounters between Yeovil and Weymouth since the 1988–89 Football Conference season.

A rivalry with Bath City dates back to numerous Southern League and Conference meetings, being described as 'fierce' during the late 1980s and early 1990s.  However, Since the turn of the century, Yeovil and Bath moved in opposite directions across the English Football Pyramid, with the two clubs being as many as five divisions apart from one another during the 2013–14 season. Having been promoted to the  EFL Championship in 2013, Yeovil played second tier football for the first time in their history during the 2013–14 season, at the same time, Bath were struggling in the sixth tier. Whilst the club were having one of the best periods in their history, Bath City were having one their worst, thus, local animosity between Bath and Yeovil dissipated.

Similarly, Hereford United were also seen as rivals, before their dissolution in 2014, due to both clubs being fairly well matched during their time in non-league ranks.

During their time in the EFL, Yeovil fans considered both Bristol Rovers and Bristol City to be rivals. In August 2009, Yeovil played Exeter City for the first time in the league, and both clubs have shared a rivalry since, with the match often being billed as a Westcountry Derby. Swindon Town and AFC Bournemouth were also considered somewhat rivals due to geographical proximity.

Players

First-team squad

Out on loan

International representatives

Club management

Corporate hierarchy

Coaching staff

Managerial history

List of chairmen
The following men have been chairman of the club's Board of Directors:

Honours and achievements

League 
Football League One (Tier 3)
Play-off winners: 2012–13
Football League Two (Tier 4)
Champions (1): 2004–05
Football Conference (Tier 5)
Champions (1): 2002–03
Isthmian League (Tier 6)
Champions (2): 1987–88, 1996–97
Southern League 
Champions (3): 1954–55, 1963–64, 1970–71
Southern League (Western Section)
Champions (3): 1923–24, 1931–32, 1934–35
Western League
Champions (4): 1921–22, 1924–25, 1929–30, 1934–35
Bristol Charity League
Champions (1): 1921–22
Dorset District League
Champions (1): 1908–09
Somerset Senior League
Champions (4): 1896–97, 1901–02, 1912–13, 1920–21

Cups 

FA Trophy
Winners (1): 2002
Bob Lord Challenge Trophy
Winners (1): 1989–90
Runners-up: 1991–92, 1993–94
Isthmian League Cup
Winners (1): 1987–88
Isthmian Championship Shield
Winners (1): 1988–89
Southern League Championship Cup
Winners (2): 1971–72, 1976–77
Southern Football League Cup
Winners (3): 1954–55, 1960–61, 1965–66
Runners-up: 1937–38, 1946–47, 1947–48, 1955–56, 1975–76, 1976–77, 1978–79
Western Football League Cup:
Winners (1): 1958–59
Somerset Professional Cup/Somerset Premier Cup:
Winners (25): 1929–30, 1930–31, 1932–33, 1934–35, 1937–38, 1938–39, 1946–47 (jointly with Bath City), 1947–48, 1949–50, 1950–51, 1953–54, 1954–55, 1955–56, 1956–57 (jointly with Bristol City), 1961–62, 1962–63, 1964–65, 1968–69 (jointly with Frome Town), 1972–73, 1975–76, 1978–79, 1996–97, 1997–98, 2004–05, 2021–22 (record)
Runners-up: 1928–29, 1931–32, 1936–37, 1945–46, 1948–49, 1960–61, 1963–64, 1966–67, 1967–68, 1970–71, 1976–77, 1980–81, 1984–85, 1985–86, 1991–92, 2002–03, 2010–11, 2014–15
Forse Somerset Charity Cup:
Winners: 1910–11, 1912–13

Club records

 Most overall appearances: Len Harris, 691 (1958–72)
 Most goals: Johnny Hayward, 548 (1906–28)
 Most League goals: Dave Taylor, 284 (1960–9)
 Record attendance Football League at Huish Park: 9,527 v Leeds United, 25 April 2008 (League One)
 Record attendance all time: 17,123 v Sunderland, 29 January 1949 (FA Cup Fourth Round)
 Longest serving player: Len Harris, 14 years (1958–72)
 Longest serving manager: Billy Kingdon, 8 years (1938–46)
 Highest League finish: 24th Championship, 2013/2014 season
 Highest transfer fee received: £1,200,000, Arron Davies and Chris Cohen, Nottingham Forest, July 2007
 Highest transfer fee paid: Undisclosed  (five figure sum), Pablo Bastianini, Quilmes Atlético Club, August 2005
 Highest victory in the Football League: 6–0 v Newport County, 15 September 2018
 Heaviest defeat in the Football League: 0–6 v Stevenage, 14 April 2012, 2–8 v Luton Town, 5 August 2017

Notes

References

External links

 
 
 Yeovil Town news from Sky Sports

 
1895 establishments in England
Association football clubs established in 1895
Football clubs in Somerset
Sport in Yeovil
Somerset County League
Dorset Football League
Western Football League
Southern Football League clubs
National League (English football) clubs
Isthmian League
Former English Football League clubs